is a Japanese game development studio.  Some of their titles include Treasure Hunter G, Evolution: The World of Sacred Device, and the Dept. Heaven series of games. Its active properties currently include Baroque, Dokapon, and the Dept. Heaven series.

On March 10, 2009, Atlus and Sting announced a partnership where Sting games would be published by Atlus in Japan. Atlus also expressed an interest in having Sting develop Atlus games.

In March 2012, Sting and fellow game developer Idea Factory formed a partnership, wherein members from both companies would collaborate to create games that would showcase both their talents. Titles developed by both companies were released under the label of Super Sting. Their first title, Generation of Chaos: Pandora’s Reflection, was released three months later, in July 2012.

Games developed and published by Sting
Sting has developed many games, both original creations and contract work, across many platforms. They also regularly port and remake games for new platforms.

References

 https://www.engadget.com/2012/05/23/among-japanese-developers-sting-quietly-thrives/

External links
  
 Sting at YouTube
 Sting at GameFAQs
 Sting at Video Game Rebirth

Software companies based in Tokyo
Video game companies established in 1989
Japanese companies established in 1989
Video game companies of Japan
Video game development companies